Geoffrey Adjet (born 15 April 1988) is a French professional footballer who plays as a left midfielder and left-back for Championnat National 2 club Romorantin.

Career

Adjet signed for Ligue 1 side Nancy in 2008. He went on to make six league appearances at the club. One of his finest moments in this period was scoring a decisive goal in the 85th minute against Caen as his team won 2–1.

In 2021, after two years of absence, Adjet returned to Romorantin.

References

1988 births
Living people
French footballers
Footballers from Marseille
Association football midfielders
Association football fullbacks
Toulouse Fontaines Club players
Toulouse FC players
Blagnac FC players
AS Nancy Lorraine players
Tours FC players
SO Romorantin players
Ligue 1 players
Ligue 2 players
Championnat National 2 players